Sol Rojas is a Venezuelan Paralympic athlete. She represented Venezuela at the 2016 Summer Paralympics and she won the silver medal in the women's 400 metres T11 event. She was also the flag bearer for her country during the 2016 Summer Paralympics Parade of Nations.

Achievements

References

External links 
 

Living people
Year of birth missing (living people)
Place of birth missing (living people)
Athletes (track and field) at the 2016 Summer Paralympics
Medalists at the 2016 Summer Paralympics
Paralympic silver medalists for Venezuela
Paralympic medalists in athletics (track and field)
Paralympic athletes of Venezuela
Venezuelan female sprinters
20th-century Venezuelan women
21st-century Venezuelan women